Favourite Colours is the fifth album by Canadian rock group The Sadies, excluding collaborations with other artists. It was released on August 24, 2004.

Track listing
All tracks by The Sadies; except where noted.

 "Northumberland West" – 2:20
 "Translucent Sparrow" – 2:59
 "1000 Cities Falling, Pt. 1" – 2:16
 "Song of the Chief Musician, Pt. 2" – 2:10
 "The Curdled Journey" – 2:53
 "Why Be So Curious, Pt. 3" (The Sadies, Rick White) – 2:39
 "The Iceberg" – 2:26
 "A Good Flying Day" – 2:25
 "Only You and Your Eyes" – 2:14
 "As Much as Such" – 2:11
 "A Burning Snowman" – 2:03
 "Coming Back" – 2:12
 "Why Would Anybody Live Here?" (Robyn Hitchcock, The Sadies) – 3:05

Personnel 

Paul Aucoin – vibraphone
Mike Belitsky – guitar, drums, vocals
Paul Brainard – pedal steel, trumpet
Joe Burns – cello
Warren Butterfield – photography
Joao Carvalho – mastering
Chris Shreenan-Dyck – engineer, audio engineer
Bruce Good – autoharp, vocals, voices
Dallas Good – guitar, vocals
Margaret Good – vocals, voices
Travis Good – fiddle, guitar, vocals
Robyn Hitchcock – vocals
Greg Keelor – backing vocals
Nick Luca – engineer, audio engineer
Amanda Schenk – photography
Craig Schumacher – mixing, audio engineer

References

2004 albums
The Sadies albums
Outside Music albums